The list of ship decommissionings in 1989 includes a chronological list of all ships decommissioned in 1989.


See also

1989
 
Ship